Madascaris is a genus of beetles in the family Carabidae, containing the following species:

 Madascaris casalei Deuve, 2015
 Madascaris centurio Basilewsky, 1980
 Madascaris enoplus (Alluaud, 1930)
 Madascaris marojejyana Basilewsky, 1980
 Madascaris octocostata (Bänninger, 1933)

References

Scaritinae